English singer and songwriter Jessie Ware has released four studio albums, twenty-seven singles, four extended plays and twenty-eight music videos.

Ware released her debut studio album Devotion in 2012, charting at number five on the UK Albums Chart. The album included the singles "Running", "110%" and "Wildest Moments". The album was later certified Gold by the British Phonographic Industry for sales over 100,000 copies. The singer's second album Tough Love was released in 2014, scoring Ware her second consecutive top-ten album. It includes the title track and the Ed Sheeran-penned "Say You Love Me" as singles. Both attained Ware's first top-forty positions on the UK Singles Chart. Her third album, Glasshouse was released in 2017 and again achieved a top-ten position in the UK. It includes the singles "Midnight", "Selfish Love" and "Alone". In 2020, she released What's Your Pleasure?, her fourth album, it includes singles such as "Spotlight" and "Save a Kiss", the album peaked at number three in the UK, being her highest appearance on the chart.

Studio albums

Reissues

Extended plays

Singles

As lead artist

Promotional singles

As featured artist

Other appearances

Music videos

Songwriting credits

References

Notes

Sources

Discographies of British artists